Essex is a town with a population of 21,216 in Essex County in southwestern Ontario, Canada, whose municipal borders extend to Lake Erie. Essex is also the name of the largest community within the municipality.

Communities
The town comprises the communities of Ambassador Beach, Barretville, Belcreft Beach, Colchester, Edgars, Essex Centre, Gesto, Harrow, Klie's Beach, Leslies Corner, Levergood Beach, Lypps Beach, Marshfield, McGregor, New Canaan, Oxley, Paquette Corners, Seymour Beach and Vereker.

History
The current Town of Essex was created on 1 April 1999 through the amalgamation of the former towns of Essex and Harrow, along with the former townships of Colchester North and Colchester South. Each community has a distinct history prior to amalgamation. Colchester South is notable for lying farther south than the northern border of California.

Essex
The Talbot Trail was heavily attributed with causing Essex to grow significantly in the last half of the 19th century. The community achieved town status in 1890.

On August 10, 1907, at the Essex Station, which is the train station located in the town of Essex, Ontario there was a large explosion that sent shock waves across the county and even into some parts of nearby Michigan. The explosion took place at roughly 9:50 am when a train cart containing  of nitro-glycerine ignited causing a massive explosion to take place. This explosion had vast effects on the immediate area as well as the surrounding outskirts of town. The result could have been much more severe as a train of vacationers from Brantford on their way to Detroit was scheduled to arrive in the station seconds before the explosion but was luckily running late; this delay saved the lives of many travellers. The boom of the explosion caused plaster to fall from the ceilings of buildings in Windsor and windows to rattle as far as Detroit. The explosion also caused over 250,000 dollars worth of property damage to the immediate area surrounding the blast zone. The reason for the explosion was leaking packaging of nitro-glycerine on one of the train carts in the station at the time that eventually dripped onto the track and when a spark was created the whole cart ignited into a giant explosion. Families all around town found their yards and in some cases even their bedrooms littered with debris that was hurled from this earth trembling event. The results of this event were many. People began to flock to Essex from all over the county to see the devastation that was left behind, and due to the type of transportation available at the time these visitors often could not make the return trip in the same day. This posed a serious problem for the accommodations available in the town as they could not keep up with these visitors and rooms were booked solid and food sources were being used up quicker than they could be replenished. Another result of this would be the need to rebuild, the Essex Station was one building very heavily damaged along with many other properties in the surrounding area and the money needed to do so would not be easy to acquire. In an investigation to see who would be responsible for the explosion and subsequently the deaths of the two men, it was deemed that the nitro-glycerine was improperly cured; however, the railway was held responsible for the improper handling of the explosive cargo. The company would be fined 125,000 dollars for their irresponsible actions and this sum would go toward the expenses of rebuilding the areas of town that were affected. This process of rebuilding would take more than two years before all of the buildings would be completely rebuilt. The town of Essex would feel the lasting effects of this explosion for years to come.

Years later in 1980 the town would face the difficulty of another devastating explosion. This one would be the result of a natural gas meter being struck by a car setting this combustible material into flames. This explosion would reap considerable damage on the town, but no one died. This explosion would have smaller effects on the town of Essex, but it would remind people of the scare that their ancestors had experienced in the early part of the century.  The Essex Station that was hit in the first explosion was rebuilt to its previous form and remains a recognizable landmark in the town today. It is often visited by tourist due to its rich and historical past. The town has even had the station put on display in one of its outdoor murals that are scattered all over town. This landmark is a symbol of the town's past.

Harrow

Governance
Essex is divided into four wards which correspond to the four major communities involved in the 1999 amalgamation. During municipal elections, residents vote for a mayor, deputy mayor, and councillor(s) in their geographical ward.
 Ward 1 - Essex Centre (2 councillors)
 Ward 2 - Colchester North (1 councillor)
 Ward 3 - Colchester South (2 councillors)
 Ward 4 - Harrow Centre (1 councillor)

Town council as of March 2022:
 Mayor - Richard Meloche
 Deputy Mayor - Steve Bjorkman
 Ward 1 Councillor - Morley Bowman
 Ward 1 Councillor - Joe Garon
 Ward 2 Councillor - Kim Verbeek
 Ward 3 Councillor - Chris Vander Doelen
 Ward 3 Councillor - Jason Matyi
 Ward 4 Councillor - Sherry Bondy

Climate

Demographics

Sports and recreation

The town of Essex is the home of the most successful Junior C hockey franchise in the province, the Essex 73's. The club has won a record 19 Great Lakes Hockey League titles along with an Ontario record 7 provincial titles. The club played 36 seasons in the historic Essex Memorial Arena and now play in the new Essex Centre Sports Complex. Essex has two minor hockey associations: The Essex Minor Hockey Association based in Essex Centre and the Harrow-Colchester South Minor Hockey Association based in Harrow. The Sun County Panthers AAA teams play out of the Essex Centre Sports Complex.

The Essex Ravens football club play in the Ontario Varsity Football League and play their games at Raider Field at Essex District High School. They have won several provincial championships.

The Essex Energizers are a competitive jump rope team based in the Town of Essex. The Essex Energizers compete at the provincial, national and international levels in the sport of jump rope. Members of the team earned a bronze medal in team show in the 2004 World Championships and Cameron MacQuarrie earned sixth place overall individually in Brisbane, Australia. The Essex Energizers are consistently one of Canada's top teams and in addition to competitions they have demonstrated at venues such as Disney World, NFL halftime shows, NBA halftime shows and Parliament Hill.

Essex has two major annual festivals. The Essex Fun Fest runs in the second week of July and the Harrow Fair occurs each labour day weekend. The Harrow Fair is the oldest community fair in Ontario.

Education
English-language public education for kindergarten through secondary school grades in Essex County is administered by the Greater Essex County District School Board, along with the Windsor-Essex Catholic District School Board which oversees English-language catholic education.

French-language public and catholic education are overseen by the Conseil scolaire Viamonde and the Conseil scolaire de district des écoles catholiques du Sud-Ouest respectively.  The scope of all of these organizations includes both the County and the City of Windsor.

Prior to 1998 the Essex County Board of Education operated Anglophone secular public schools.

One public secondary school of the Greater Essex County District School Board is situated in Essex. Essex District High School serves Essex Centre, Colchester North and areas of Tecumseh, Lakeshore, and Kingsville. Kingsville District High School serves Harrow Centre and Colchester South, following the closure of Harrow District High School in 2016. Public school students from certain areas of Essex may attend General Amherst High School in Amherstburg.  While there is no separate secondary school within the boundaries of Essex, students in the town may attend the Windsor-Essex Catholic District School Board's St. Thomas of Villanova Catholic High School in LaSalle or Cardinal Carter Catholic High School in Leamington.

Elementary schools of the Greater Essex County District School Board include Essex Public School, Colchester North Public School, and Harrow Public School.  Separate elementary schools of the Windsor-Essex Catholic District School Board include Holy Name Catholic Elementary School and St. Anthony Catholic Elementary School.

Wildlife
Essex was once known region-wide for its large crow population. The nightly infestation was particularly acute in the late 1980s and early 1990s. However, with the consistent use of "boomers" and other techniques that discourage roosting at sundown, the crows eventually dispersed. Susceptible to West Nile virus, the crow population appears to have declined in recent times.

See also

 List of municipalities in Ontario
List of townships in Ontario

References

External links

 
Lower-tier municipalities in Ontario
Towns in Ontario